Protein GPR89 is a protein that in humans is encoded by the GPR89B gene.

Related gene problems
1q21.1 deletion syndrome
1q21.1 duplication syndrome

References

Further reading